An ultraviolet (UV) marker is a pen whose marks are fluorescent but transparent: the marks can be seen only under an ultraviolet light. They are commonly used in security situations to identify belongings or to prevent the reproduction of unauthorized banknotes. UV pens can now be bought at some stationery shops to securely  mark items of high value in case of theft.

Materials used to make UV markers

The body of a UV marker is made by plastic similar to a normal marker. 

The ink used in UV markers has been made from various things in the past such as lemon juice, vinegar, diluted blood or even urine. Modern UV-invisible ink is mainly made by a fluorescent derived from things in nature that glow when exposed to an ultraviolet light. The main components include dilute laundry detergent, body fluids, tonic water and vitamin B-12 dissolved in vinegar.

There are different types of UV-invisible ink: opaque, semi-opaque and translucent. All of the three contain acrylic monomers which contain a diluent and a photoinitiator to participate in the curing reaction and to respond to UV radiation. Photoinitiators is a very important element for making the ink as it is the substance that absorbs the UV mission of a UV light, which enable the marker to work.

How a UV-marker works

The UV LEDs used to read the message written by UV markers emits near-ultraviolet light. This near-ultraviolet radiant energy is also called black light which fall just outside the visible spectrum with a wavelength of 380 nm. Such wavelength are very narrow and will fall within a much broader band than regular fluorescent black lights. Therefore, UV LEDs are completely safe. It will cause no damage to eyes nor risks of skin cancer. When the black light falls upon the UV-visible ink, it makes the ink fluoresce, where it emits visible light and make the message readable for human eyes.

Fluorescence is caused by a conversion of energy; when the invisible ultraviolet falls on the fluorescent surface, it is absorbed and re-emitted as visible light radiation. The absorption of energy by the electrons in the UV-visible ink enables this to happen. When an extra amount of energy is absorbed, the electrons jump into higher energy orbital patterns surrounding the nucleus. Eventually, the energy is released as visible light when they fall back to their normal orbital shell. The difference between the original electron orbital and the new orbital pattern will determine the color of the fluorescent.

In some cases, people can also use photocopiers to develop UV-visible ink message as the head of the photocopiers contain UV components.

Application & uses of UV marker

Security
Commercially available UV markers are used to mark things for security purpose, such as to check for counterfeit money and mark property in the event of theft for the purpose of identifying ownership. It is also sometimes used in identifying whether a similar documents is an original copy.

Authentic purpose
UV markers are also widely used on credit cards or lottery ticket for authentic purpose. For example, in the state of Illinois, the lottery tickets are stamped with UV-invisible ink to indicate authenticity whereas credit cards are marked with a particular logo or the card type. Moreover, various countries use UV markers to create marks on stated issued driving licenses and identity cards to ensure they are authentic.
Other cases include retailers marking their items to avoid customers to exchange or return items they were not originally bought from their stores.

Protect secret messages
Many people and organizations use UV marker to protect and hide sensitive messages from the public. Especially during the war time, UV-invisible was widely used in militaries to hide secret messages and important addresses to avoid their enemy to have detail information on their next step of action as this will put them on advantage by providing them time to prepare and giving them chances to destruct their plans.

During World War II., a battle between laboratories to develop the best UV invisible ink was revealed between the Allies & the Axis powers. They were desperately trying to develop new, better UV-invisible inks that can only be revealed by a very few type of UV light with a very particular size of wavelength. This is not only because so that they can hide more messages from their enemy but this will also allow them to find out the method to read the hidden message of by their enemy.

Toilet cleaning assessment
People use UV markers to inspect whether the cleaner has cleaned the toilet properly and rank how well the toilet is cleaned. The marker used in this case is a lotion, which is non-toxic and water-soluble, so it can easily be removed by soap and water solutions. The UV marker is applied to the underside of the toilet seat. It is not readily visible under regular room lighting. The toilet will then be visually inspected with a hand-held UV light to rank how well the toilet is cleaned a few days later. The inspector will then make a visual score; 1 represents light fluorescence, 2 for moderate, 3 for heavy and 0 represented no fluorescence. This scoring system is based on visual inspection and an average cleaning score will be calculated. If no cleaning was taken place, the marker will show heavy fluorescence which will at least last for 7 days after it was applied. The less the marker is found, the better the toilet is being cleaned.

Limitation of UV marker
Messages written by a UV marker can be discovered by the incorrect people when there is a change of reflectivity of the paper or a pen scratches mark on the paper. The smell of the ink also reduces the security of secret messages as the hidden messages can be easily found with the help of trained animals.

UV marker should not be used on surfaces that may already contain similar elements found in the UV marker ink, such as the high brightness copier papers. This is because the message will not be shown clearly as the surface will change color or react along with the ink when under UV light. Therefore, we should always test on surface in an inconspicuous area to determine results. Similarly, when writing with a UV marker on very smooth and glossy surfaces, the ink will only show an unclear outline of what is written and may be rubbed off easily. This is because the ink is prevented from being deeply absorbed into the surface like it would on a piece of normal paper. Moreover, messages can be easily visible when exposed under glancing light.

Unlike other invisible inks, which require heat or placing chemical liquid over to reveal the message, the UV invisible ink can be screened and read quickly with an ultraviolet light source without damaging or changing the surface of the paper. This means that people will not be able to tell or notice if a secret message has been intercepted by a third party.

See also
 List of pen types, brands and companies

References

Pens